Toyota Motor Manufacturing Missouri (TMMMO) is a manufacturing plant in Troy, Missouri that focuses on building cylinder heads for straight-four engines built by Toyota. It is a subsidiary of Toyota Motor North America, itself a subsidiary of Toyota Motor Corporation of Japan.

The company traces its roots back to 1912 when Jesse Bodine founded the Bodine Pattern Company in St. Louis. Bodine produced mold castings for various customers including automotive. When Toyota started to expand its manufacturing presence in North America in the late 1980s turned to Bodine to supply aluminum parts. In 1990, the automaker purchased the company, renaming it Bodine Aluminum.

In 1991, Toyota broke ground on an additional plant in Troy, Missouri that would open in 1993. Bodine Aluminum opened a plant in Jackson, Tennessee in 2003, and closed its St. Louis plant in December 2018.

In 2020, the company's name changed from Bodine Aluminum to Toyota Motor Manufacturing Missouri, while the Jackson plant became Toyota Motor Manufacturing Tennessee.

Toyota Motor Manufacturing Missouri has the ability to build more than 3 million cylinder heads annually on three production lines.

The plant is located next to Missouri Smelting Technology (MOST), an aluminum recycler that provides raw material to TMMMO. MOST is a subsidiary of Toyota Tsusho, another company in Japan's Toyota Group.

References 

Toyota factories
Motor vehicle assembly plants in Missouri
Buildings and structures in Lincoln County, Missouri
Industrial buildings completed in 1993